Karnali Province, formerly Karnali Province, is a province of Nepal. It is located in western part of Nepal, surrounded by Gandaki Province in the east, Lumbini Province in the south-east, Sudurpashchim Province in the west and Tibet of China in the north.

Previously, Karnali Province was a development region of Nepal, which known as Mid-Western Development Region. The Mid-Western Development Region comprised three zones and 15 districts. Districts were divided into Municipalities and Villages.

Administrative structure
Karnali is divided into 10 districts and districts are subdivided into Municipalities.

Districts
Karnali is divided into 10 districts.

Municipality
There are 25 municipalities in Karnali Province, which is also known as Urban Municipality.

Rural Municipality
There are 54 rural municipality in Karnali Province:

Judiciary

High court

District court

Legislature

Constituency

References

External links
 http://mofald.gov.np/sites/default/files/News_Notices/Final%20District%201-75%20Corrected%20Last%20for%20RAJPATRA.pdf

Karnali Province
Subdivisions of Nepal